Beverly Hills Historic District is a national historic district located at Burlington, Alamance County, North Carolina. It encompasses 108 contributing buildings, 3 contributing structures, and 2 contributing objects in a planned residential subdivision of Burlington.  Most of the buildings are houses, one to two stories high, built between about 1919 and 1959 in I-house, Tudor Revival, American Craftsman, Colonial Revival, and Mediterranean Revival styles of frame or brick construction.

The district was added to the National Register of Historic Places in 2009.

References

Historic districts on the National Register of Historic Places in North Carolina
Houses on the National Register of Historic Places in North Carolina
Tudor Revival architecture in North Carolina
Colonial Revival architecture in North Carolina
Buildings and structures in Burlington, North Carolina
National Register of Historic Places in Alamance County, North Carolina
Houses in Alamance County, North Carolina